Chicago TARDIS is an annual North American science fiction convention focusing on the British television series Doctor Who and related programs, held the weekend after Thanksgiving in Chicago. This event has been rated among the top five conventions for fans of Doctor Who living in the United States. The event bills itself as the “premier Doctor Who event” for the midwest. The conference, along with the Los Angeles Gallifrey One, helped show fan support well before the BBC, having stopped production in 1989, decided to revive Doctor Who in 2005. The Chicago event is organized by Alien Entertainment, a Chicago area entertainment store focused on sci-fi and pop culture. Chicago TARDIS has been held every year since 2000 in the Chicago area and has featured actors, actresses, script editors, writers, visual effects designers, directors, and screenwriters associated with Doctor Who in various ways.

List of Chicago TARDIS events

References

External links
 
 

Science fiction conventions in the United States
Doctor Who fandom
2000 establishments in Illinois
Recurring events established in 2000
Conventions in Illinois